Víctor Manuel Bautista López (born 1 January 1958) is a Mexican politician affiliated with the PRD. He currently serves as Deputy of the LXII Legislature of the Mexican Congress representing the Mexico state.

References

1958 births
Living people
People from Villahermosa
Members of the Chamber of Deputies (Mexico)
Party of the Democratic Revolution politicians
Politicians from Tabasco
21st-century Mexican politicians
Members of the Congress of the State of Mexico
Deputies of the LXII Legislature of Mexico